Aframomum daniellii, also known as African cardamom, is a species in the ginger family, Zingiberaceae. It was first described by Joseph Dalton Hooker, and got its current name from Karl Moritz Schumann.

Range
Aframomum daniellii is found in West tropical Africa, from Sierra Leone to the Central African Republic, south to Angola.

Use
A. daniellii is traditionally used as a spice in the regions of Africa it is native. The plant is also used for medicinal purposes as a laxative, anti-parasitic, and to fight other microbial infections.

In Cameroon, many dietary spices are used by traditional healers to cure several diseases such as cancer and microbial infections. Aframomum daniellii, Dichrostachys cinerea and Echinops giganteus are Cameroonian spices widely used as flavourings and as food additives. Moreover, they are traditionally herbal remedies employed to treat several diseases, as well as to control populations of insect pests. In this research, we analysed the chemical composition of A. daniellii, D. cinerea and E. giganteus essential oils and we evaluated their larvicidal potential against larvae of the filariasis and West Nile virus vector Culex quinquefasciatus. The essential oils were obtained from different plant parts by hydrodistillation and their composition was analysed by GC-MS. The three spices exhibited different volatile chemical profiles, being characterized by 1,8-cineole, sabinene and β-pinene (A. daniellii), geraniol and terpinen-4-ol (D. cinerea), and silphiperfol-6-ene and presilphiperfolan-8-ol (E. giganteus). Results showed that the highest larvicidal toxicity on Cx. quinquefasciatus was exerted by D. cinerea essential oil (LC50 = 39.1 μL L-1), followed by A. daniellii (pericarp essential oil: LC50 = 65.5 μL L-1; leaves: LC50 = 65.5μL L-1; seeds: LC50 = 106.5μL L-1) and E. giganteus (LC50 = 227.4 μL L-1). Overall, the chance to use the D. cinerea essential oil against Cx. quinquefasciatus young instars seems promising, since it is effective at moderate doses and could be an advantageous alternative to build newer mosquito control tools.

References 

daniellii